The Hyatt Regency Dallas is a 28-story, 1,120-room hotel in the Reunion district of Dallas, Texas, United States  The building is connected to Union Station and Reunion Tower, which is the city's landmark observation tower in downtown Dallas. The Y-shaped building has an atrium on the south side. In 1998, the hotel added a low-rise ballroom with an area of 32,000 square feet (the equivalent of 3,000 square meters). The Hyatt Regency Dallas recently completed a $50-million renovation that features newly redone guest rooms, bathrooms, and corridors.

In popular culture 
The building was featured in the opening credits of the TV series Dallas for the entirety of the show's 13-year run (1978-1991).

References

External links
 
 Hyatt Regency Dallas official site
 Hyatt Regency Dallas Photos

Skyscraper hotels in Dallas
Hotel buildings completed in 1978
Hyatt Hotels and Resorts